Jens Juel-Vind (1694 – 20 December 1726), baron of Juellinge, was a Danish chamberlain and landowner.

Early life
Juel-Vind was born in 1694, the son of Friderich Vind of Harrested and Baggesvogn, and Sophia Catharina, Baroness Juel of Juellinge. His mother was a daughter of the statesman Jens Juel. He had no sons to succeed him as Baron of Juellinge and the estate was therefore passed on to his son-in-law in 1700.

Career and property
He owned Juellinge from 1706. On 1 May 1708, he was awarded title of frierre under the name Juel-Vind. He was a student at the University of Copenhagen from 1712 to 1717. He served as a squire (kammerjunker) at Frederick IV's court. In 1719, he ceded the Barony of Juellinge to the king in exchange for Halsted Priory on Lolland. On 26 December 1721, Halsted Priory was elevated to a barony under the name Juellinge. He then served as squire for Princess Sophia Hedwig. On 1 April 1725, he was appointed to chamberlain (kammerherre).

Family
 
On 27 June 1721, Juel-Vind married baroness Ide Helle Margaretha baronesse Krag (23 May 1697 - 28 August 1738). They had three children:
 Friderica Charlotte, Baroness Juel-Vind (30 July 1723 - 9 April 1761)
 Jens Krag-Juel-Vind, Baron of Juellinge (15 June 1724 - 30 April 1776)
 Edel Sophie, Baroness Juel-Vind (28 October 1725 - 26 January 1796)

References

External links

Barons of Denmark
18th-century Danish landowners
People from Stevns Municipality
1694 births
1726 deaths